Hepfidelity is the second studio album by Australian singer/songwriter Diesel. The album was released in March 1992 through Chrysalis Records and EMI Records, and held the number-one spot on the ARIA Albums Chart for four weeks. It included the singles "Love Junk", "Come to Me", "Tip of My Tongue", "Man Alive" and "One More Time".

The album was certified 3× platinum in Australia.

Hepfidelity was rereleased in Europe in 1993 with 3 bonus studio tracks. These tracks were also released on the 1993 album The Lobbyist.

The album was remastered in 2022 for its 30th anniversary as Hepfidelity 30 with a second disc of previously unreleased tracks.

Track listing

Personnel
 Engineered by Rick Will and Mark Desisto
 Assisted by Stoli Jaeger	 	 
 Produced by Terry Manning, 
 Mixed by Paul Lani and Rick Will
 String arrangements written and conducted by Carl Marsh
 Recorded at Hot Tin Roof Studios, Los Angeles and Studio Six, Memphis (TN)

Charts

Weekly charts

Year-end charts

Certifications

See also
 List of number-one albums in Australia during the 1990s
 Hepfidelity and More

References

1992 debut albums
ARIA Award-winning albums
Diesel (musician) albums
Albums produced by Terry Manning
Albums produced by Don Gehman